was a Japanese domain of the Edo period. It was associated with Chikuzen Province in modern-day Fukuoka Prefecture on the island of Kyushu. The domain was also sometimes referred to as Chikuzen Domain, or as Kuroda Domain, after the ruling Kuroda family.

In the han system, Fukuoka was a political and economic abstraction based on periodic cadastral surveys and projected agricultural yields.  In other words, the domain was defined in terms of kokudaka, not land area. This was different from the feudalism of the West. With its rating of 473,000 koku, the domain was the fifth-largest in Japan, excluding the domains held by the Tokugawa-Matsudaira dynasty.

List of daimyōs 

The hereditary daimyōs were head of the clan and head of the domain.

  Kuroda clan, 1600–1868 (tozama; 502,000→412,000→433,000→473,000 koku)

Nagamasa
Tadayuki
Mitsuyuki
Tsunamasa
Nobumasa
Tsugutaka
Haruyuki
Harutaka
Naritaka
Narikiyo
Nagahiro
Nagatomo
Prince Arisugawa Taruhito (briefly ruled domain as imperial governor in 1871)

Family tree

 I. Kuroda Nagamasa, 1st daimyō of Fukuoka (cr. 1600) (1568–1623; Lord of Fukuoka: 1600–1623)
 II. Tadayuki, 2nd daimyō of Fukuoka (1602–1654; r. 1623–1654)
 III. Mitsuyuki, 3rd daimyō of Fukuoka (1628–1707; r. 1654–1688)
 IV. Tsunamasa, 4th daimyō of Fukuoka (1659-1711; r. 1688-1711)
 V. Nobumasa, 5th daimyō of Fukuoka (1685–1744; r. 1711–1719)
Nagakiyo, daimyō of Nogata (1667–1720)
 VI. Tsugutaka, 6th daimyō of Fukuoka (1703–1775; r. 1719–1769)

As Tsugutaka, the sixth daimyō, was without heirs, he adopted an heir from a branch of the Tokugawa family to continue the line:

Tokugawa Munetada, 1st Hitotsubashi-Tokugawa family head (1721–1765)
Tokugawa Harusada, 2nd Hitotsubashi-Tokugawa family head (1751–1827)
 IX. Naritaka, 9th daimyō of Fukuoka (1777–1795; r. 1782–1795)
 X. Narikiyo, 10th daimyō of Fukuoka (1795–1851; r. 1795–1834). He had a daughter:
Junhime (d. 1851), m.  XI. (Shimazu) Nagahiro, 11th daimyō of Fukuoka, 11th family head (1811–1887; r. 1834–1869; family head: 1834–1869). He had a daughter:
Rikuhime, m.  XII. (Tōdō) Nagatomo, 12th daimyō of Fukuoka, 12th family head (1839–1902; Lord: 1869; Governor: 1869–1871; family head: 1869–1878)
Nagashige, 13th family head, 1st Marquess (1867–1939; family head: 1878–1939; Marquess: 1884)
Nagamichi, 14th family head, 2nd Marquess (1889–1978; family head: 1939–1978; 2nd Marquess: 1939–1947)
Nagahisa, 15th family head (1916–2009; family head: 1978–2009)
Nagataka, 16th family head (b. 1952; family head: 2009–present)
 VII.(Kuroda) Haruyuki, 7th daimyō of Fukuoka (1753–1781; r. 1769–1781). Adopted by the sixth Lord of Fukuoka. He adopted an heir, the eighth 'daimyō:
 VIII. (Kyōgoku) Harutaka, 8th daimyō of Fukuoka'' (1754–1782; r. 1782)

See also 
 List of Han
 Abolition of the han system

References

External links

 Fukuoka Domain on "Edo 300 HTML" 

Domains of Japan